Lesní stadion is a sports stadium located in the town of Třinec, Czech Republic. It now serves as a training ground for the local Athletics team after a long time of being the home ground of the FK Třinec football club.

It has recently undergone a renovation. In 2007 the Championship of the Czech Republic in Athletics took place here.

Multi-purpose stadiums in the Czech Republic
Sport in Třinec
Sports venues in the Moravian-Silesian Region